James Franklin Lee (March 12, 1980 – June 24, 2016) was an American football defensive end that was drafted by the Green Bay Packers in the 2003 NFL Draft. Lee played college football at College of the Redwoods, a junior college in Eureka, California, and Oregon State.

After his athletic career, Lee opened Nor Cal Pets and Grooming with his wife, Leah, in McKinleyville, California. 

On June 24, 2016, Lee died from complications from diabetes. He was 36 years old.

References

External links
NFL.com player page

1980 births
2016 deaths
Sportspeople from Salem, Oregon
American football defensive tackles
American football defensive ends
Oregon State Beavers football players
Green Bay Packers players
Amsterdam Admirals players
Deaths from diabetes
Players of American football from Oregon